Nomadic is the second studio album by American neo soul singer Adriana Evans, released in 2004 on the independent label Next Thing. The album featured two singles, "Remember the Love" and "7 Days". Nomadic was re-issued in 2009 with enhanced media ("7 Days" music video).<ref>Re-issue CD.Discogs.com</ref> The lead single, "Remember the Love", was used as the theme song for Logo's TV series, Noah's Arc and is featured on its soundtrack album.

Track listing
All tracks written by Adriana Evans and Johnathan "Dred" Scott

Notes
The music and artwork for this re-issue is identical to the 2004 release except for the CDs enhanced portion containing a music video for the song, "7 Days".

Personnel
Adriana Evans: Lead vocals, Background vocals
Producer: Jonathan Scott
Hakeem Williams: Piano (Track 1)
Jay Frisco: Acoustic Guitar (Track 4)
Sal Mendez: Bass Guitar (Track 1)
Yohimba: Electric Guitar (Track 4)
Darryl Crocks: Acoustic, Bass Guitar (Tracks 3, 12, 13)
Joe Conrad: Electric Guitar (Track 5)
Trevor Lawrence: Drums (Track 7)
Greg Moore: Guitar 
Javier Espinosa: Guitar (Track 7)
Michael Lazer: Mastered
Preston Boebel [Additional] Mixer
Vito Colapietro II [Additional] Mixer (Track 2)
Charlie Beuter: Mixer

Credits
Producer – Jonathan "Dred" Scott*
Co-producer – Adriana Evans
All tracks written by – Adriana Evans and Jonathan Dred Scott

References

External links
adrianaevans.com
Nomadic CD.soulexpress''

2004 albums
Adriana Evans albums
Albums produced by Dred Scott (musician)